Hoseynabad (also Romanized as Ḩoseynābād and Hosein Abad) is a village in Balesh Rural District, in the Central District of Darab County, Fars Province, Iran. At the 2006 census, its population was 243, in 58 families.

References 

Populated places in Darab County